Pelochrista buddhana is a species of moth of the family Tortricidae. It is found in Mongolia and western China.

References

Moths described in 1919
Eucosmini